is a 1998 Japanese Transformers anime series, spawning a movie and a toyline. It was broadcast on TV Tokyo from April 1998 to January 1999, and was the first Transformers anime to be produced by Nihon Ad Systems and animated by the studio Ashi Productions. The series was preceded by Beast Wars: Transformers, and was followed by Super Life-Form Transformers: Beast Wars Neo. The series has a much lighter tone and is aimed more toward children, whereas the more accessible Beast Wars was intended for a wider age-range. The anime uses conventional animation rather than the CGI of its predecessor. With the exception of the faction leaders, all of the characters within the toy-line are either remolds, reissues, or recolors of earlier Beast Wars or Generation 2/Machine Wars toys.

In addition to the 43 episodes, there is also a 50-minute movie, Beast Wars II: Lio Convoy's Close Call!, which takes place sometime between episodes 32 and 38, and a manga adaptation by Shōji Imaki that was serialized in Comic BomBom from July 1998 to February 1999, also localized in Korea by Daewon Media. The anime was also released in Korea, and it was broadcast on SBS.

Plot
Beast Wars II tells the story of a battle waging between Lio Convoy's team of Cybertrons (Maximals) and Galvatron's army of Destrons (Predacons) on the planet Gaia. As Lio Convoy and Galvatron fight over the mysterious energy source known as Angolmois Energy, many strange occurrences and mysterious properties of Angolmois Energy begin to arise.

Characters

Maximals
The young Maximal (called Cybertrons in Japan) crew of the Star Voyager find themselves on a post-apocalyptic Earth called Gaia with the mysterious Angolmois Energy. Their goal is to defend Gaia from the forces of Galvatron and his Predacons, otherwise they will be destroyed.

 Lio Convoy — Lio Convoy is honest, with a strong sense of right and wrong, and at times his seriousness appears humorous. He has a harsh, career-military side to him, but also has a human's gentleness. There are times when he behaves as if he knows something about the secrets of the planet where the battle is taking place. His beast mode is that of a white lion. Lio Convoy is also known in some continuities as Leo Prime, and is one of the more prominently featured Beast Wars II characters to appear in other Transformers series. He and his crew feature somewhat prominently in Beast Wars: The Gathering and Beast Wars: The Ascending, where several of them are a Black ops unit known as the Pack. He has also appeared in toy form outside Beast Wars II, typically as a repaint/remold of another Transformer with a lion alternate mode. These toys have included recolors of Transformers: Cybertron Leobreaker, Transformers: Prime Thundertron, and Titans Return Alpha Trion. Lio Convoy's original toy was also briefly considered for use as a version of Alpha Trion; several actual recolors were released, including Galva Lio Convoy and Black Lio Convoy. A Timelines Lio Convoy created from Generations Orion Pax was also released that transformed into a truck with lion-like decorations. This mold was later recolored into another Galva Lio Convoy.

 Apache — Apache is a cool, composed authority figure. He is the second in command of the maximals. He has also shown his sightly eccentric side when he began transforming into a mandrill, snarling when upset. He and Lio Convoy have taken over control of operations. His entire body is a mass of weapons and his "Mode 3" fortress mode fusillades are powerful. His toy is identical to the Western Hasbro release of Beast Wars' B'Boom.

 Bighorn — He is known to charge headfirst into battle. Bighorn hates to show his back to the enemy, and because of this, there are times when he plays into the enemy's hands. He is also known to have a gentle, nature loving side. Has a "Buffalo Missile" weapon with his tail as the trigger. He has his friends handle the trigger timing (by having them pull his tail) so he can concentrate on taking aim, thus raising his accuracy rating. He transforms into a bison and many around him have a habit of calling him a bull to which he will instantly retort "I'm a buffalo!" The color red will make him enter an uncontrollable rage - quite inconvenient when he has to gather red roses for his crush, Scylla. His toy is a recolor of the Hasbro Beast Wars Bonecrusher figure.

 Scuba — A squid mode Transformer and thereby fastest in the water of the Maximals, Scuba grasps his enemies in his tentacles, drains their energy with his suckers, then delivers the final blow with his sharp fangs. A shy and cool type, given the choice, he prefers to be alone, and he is quick to see the down side of things. Somehow, he is gifted with great penmanship, and is asked to write love letters, battle challenges and so on. "I said I would not do it, so forget it!" he usually responds. Often makes squid-related puns. Scylla had an unrequited crush on him, due to both of them having squid alt modes. His toy is identical to the Hasbro release of the figure, called Claw Jaw.

 Tasmania Kid — The idol and prankster figure of the Maximals, Kid nonetheless desires more than anyone else to be recognized as a full-fledged warrior. The actions that result from his ambitions often end up making a situation worse. He loves adventure and will often stay out overnight without permission, getting his fill of nature - and getting Lio Convoy mad at him as well. He has sharp teeth known as "Tasmania Fangs" and specializes in biting attacks. Originally, he intended to become a cheetah or a falcon like Cheetor and Airazor before him, but as he was scanning an eagle, a Tasmanian devil jumped onto his face and forced him to adopt that as his beast mode. He becomes good friends with both Lio Junior and Scissorboy, who are his age. His toy is identical to the Hasbro release of the Beast Wars figure Snarl.

 Diver — A guard stationed at the Niagara base, Diver's jumping power is the greatest of the Maximals. Prudent and timid, yet also rather careless, he usually avoids dangerous work by saying, "It was my grandfather's dying wish...." On the other hand, moved by friendship, he has often met danger head on. In frog mode, Diver appears unarmed, but can catch enemies by surprise with a tongue-punch or freak them out by extending his robot head from his frog mode's mouth. His specialty is singing, and he sings rap songs to himself. When he's surprised in robot mode, Diver's neck pops out to its full length. He speaks in a Kansai dialect. His toy is a green and white recolor of the Hasbro Beast Wars figure Spittor, and was released with a Niagara Waterfall base set.

 Ikard  — Born Ikard Octoba Barks, he and Scuba are cousins and friends since childhood. Ikard is like a big brother to Scuba, and taught him the Surumerang attack, Scuba's specialty. Normally, he is a cool sort roaming about through space, playing a big role in cooperation with the Cybertron forces. On the other hand, he also has a gentle side, and is always worried for his cousin Scuba. Ikard is quite erudite, and is also known as a historian. He speaks in Kansai dialect. This toy is a blue and white repaint of Claw Jaw from the Hasbro Beast Wars line, and was sold alongside the Takotank figure (itself a Microman vehicle repainted). 

 Magnaboss Squad — Appearing in the second half of the series, these three can combine into MagnaBoss. A fusion of Lio Junior's courage, Skywarp's intelligence, and Santon's kindness, he is a symbol of hope for the Maximals. From his Magnablade, a combo-sword made from the union of three component robot's weapons, Magnaboss fires laser shockwaves that mow down approaching enemies. He can also shoot off tremendous Angolmois Balls from his horns and fire sky missiles from his body.
 Lio Junior — Lio Junior was created by the influence of the good Angolmois Energy upon the Matrix in Lio Convoy's chest, serving as the de facto leader of the Magnaboss Squad. He possesses an innocent, free and wild personality. His tail becomes a Lion Vute Whip, while twin horns extend from his mane to fire Angolmois Ball light spheres. His mane can also become Lion Wings, with which he can fly for short distances. In the series finale, he is revealed to have the ability to combine with Lio Convoy to give him more power. He forms Magnaboss' chest and head, whilst his Lion Vute Whip forms the Magnablade's handle and hilt. Redeco of Prowl from Beast Wars I.
 Skywarp — Skywarp is an aerial combat instructor dispatched from Cybertron as reinforcements for Lio Convoy's troops. Although he is strict, he has more consideration than anyone else for young Maximal warriors. Part of his wings becomes Wing Caliber Swords and he has super-oscillation generators in his wing tips. Combining these with his sonic booms, he clears the ground around him. And if that's not enough, he can fold over his wings and fire his Sky Missiles. He converts to an eagle. He forms Magnaboss' headgear, chestplate and back, whilst his Wing Caliber Swords form the Magnablade's blade. Redeco of Superion Silverbolt from Beast Wars I.
 Santon — Cybertron's best medical doctor, Santon was dispatched along with Skywarp as reinforcements for Lio Convoy's troops. Santon is a philanthropist who highly values the sanctity of life. In Beast Mode, he has Ki-Shot cannons behind his ears, though these have no capacity to kill or wound. He can stomp his feet and shake the ground for his Santon Quake, a terrific ability that leaves his enemies unable to stand. He can also project his Santon Shield barrier from his tusks. He transforms into an African elephant, a rarity among beast-mode Transformers. He forms the majority of Magnaboss, chiefly the arms and legs, whilst his club weapons form part of the Magnablade. Redeco of Ironhide from Beast Wars I.

 Optimus Primal — Appearing in the movie special only, Optimus Primal was the previous Maximal commander brought to Gaia from the past (during season one of Beast Wars) by Magnaboss to help out against Majin Zarak. He is much like Lio Convoy in personality, but transforms into an gorilla. After he and Lio Convoy overcome the Majin Zarak crises, he returns to his own time.

Insectrons
Formerly mercenaries, the Insectrons ended up on the Antarctica region of Gaia where they live peacefully. Originally, they often battled their sworn rivals the Autorollers until Starscream tricked them into fighting the Maximals. However, the ruse was ruined by Galvatron's fits, and later they allied themselves with the Maximals. The toys for the Insectrons are recolors of several Beast Wars Predacons with insect forms and are meant to be different characters altogether.

 Bigmos — Bigmos is the official leader of the Insectrons. However, as each of Insectrons does as he pleases, they lack cooperative spirit. Before coming to planet Gaia, they were soldiers running about the universe, and were even familiar with the Autorollers. Bigmos can transform into a "Mode 3" ant-lion form. He has a weakness for tomato juice. The Needle Missiles he fires from his mouth can pierce steel. His beast mode is a mosquito. Redeco of Mosquitor from Beast Wars I.

 Powerhug — The Insectrons' judo master, Powerhug is covered with an incredibly durable shell. He is Straightforward of character, and for unknown reasons he speaks with a Kyushu dialect. Long ago, he apparently had a nasty experience with the Autorollers, and is hoping to settle the score. His special skill is the Hug Hell Wheel, in which he rolls into a ball and delivers a body blow. In beast mode, his fangs and tail become alloy cutters. His crushing Power Hug pinions his enemies. Powerhug was named the 19th top unfortunately named Transformer by Topless Robots. His beast mode is a pill bug. Redeco of Retrax from Beast Wars I.

 Tonbot — The Insectrons' requisite spy, Tonbot is a flashy type who enjoys dressing up. His specialty is strewing his conversation with English. His tail contains powerful Botshot homing missiles, and he can blast a solvent liquid or mist from his mouth, literally enveloping pursuing enemies in smoke. His flight speed is the fastest of the Insectrons, and he can fly as high as the stratosphere under his own power. His beast mode is a dragonfly. Shares the same mold as Beast Wars I Jetstorm.

 Mantis — The Insectrons often take independent action, but even among them, Mantis is an especially independent samurai. He is strongly territorial, and does not tolerate anyone disturbing his sleep. The sickle blades on his arms are incredibly sharp, and his Full-Moon Slice confuses his enemies' sight, and then delivers the final blow. He can freely guide his saucer shurikens via telepathy. Autolauncher's disks provide a good challenge. His beast mode is a mantis. Shares his mold with Manterror from Beast Wars I.

 Drillnuts — The self-styled "Greatest Inventor of the Insectrons", Drillnuts is forever building highly useless items. He is also an expert in bombs and gunpowder. Rather sarcastic in personality, he is also uncommonly tenacious. Using his arm drill, he can travel freely about underground, carrying out sneak attacks from beneath his enemies' feet. Drillnuts was named the 12th top unfortunately named Transformer by Topless Robots. His beast mode is a boll weevil. Redeco of Drillbit from Beast Wars I.

 Scissorboy — Talkative and quick-witted, Scissorboy seems to have hit it off with Tasmania Kid and is good friends with him. Before finding his way to planet Gaia, he was also familiar with the Autorollers, but not friendly with them. The pincers on his tail (Mighty Scissors) can be equipped in either his chest or his hand when he's in robot mode. He is also a bit fussy about money. His beast mode is an earwig.

Jointron Brothers

In Beast Wars II, Tripledacus is a combiner team. Its component parts are a lobster (Gimlet), a Japanese rhinoceros beetle (Motorarm) and a cicada (DJ).

The Jointron have a tendency to mix in bad Spanish language phrases and to have certain affinity for Mexican culture, as they are sometimes wearing sombreros and playing maracas.

 DJ — Eldest of the three Jointron brothers, DJ has a habit of wetting himself whenever he's had too much oil to drink. Hidden in his wings are two Seven-Year Swords. If he uses them in a normal, straightforward way, he can chop even large trees in two at a single stroke, but he seems to prefer playing music with them by snapping them together. DJ also creates special sound waves that can be heard 10,000 km away. His toy is a redeco of Cicadacon from Beast Wars I.

 Motorarm — Middle member of the three brothers, Motorarm is a sumo wrestler who belongs to the Trias Room of Universal Sumo Association. He is undergoing warrior training with his brothers in order to cure his ever-excitable nature. With his fearsome strength, he can even lift up Megastorm bare-handed. The source of his power is energon chanko-nabe (a filling stew that is a standard of sumo wrestler's diets). In his shell he holds a steel blade called the Utchari (Pullback) Claw. Objects struck by the light and heat of Magma Horn on his head are melted into soup. His toy is a redeco of Ram Horn from Beast Wars I.

 Gimlet — Youngest of the three Jointron brothers, Gimlet is cheerful regardless of the state of battle. His buttagiri (Cruncher) claws have a vise-like power to crush and grind, enough even to turn coal into diamond instantly. He also has powerful Lobslicer cutters inside those claws, but does not use them often as weapons, rattling them like maracas instead. His toy is a redeco of Sea Clamp from Beast Wars I.

The combined form of DJ, Motorarm and Gimlet is known as Tripledacus. Taller than even Galvatron and practically a match for Lio Convoy in abilities, he only lacks in mobility. His right hand is the Triple Blaster, an all-purpose gun formed from the union of the three Jointrons' weapons. It can slice a tank into thirds, or fire its Seven-Year Sword missiles to sink a battleship 4 km away. His left hand is composed of Motorarm's Magma Horns, which melt whatever they touch.

The Jointron Brothers first appear in episode #14, "The Combined Giant, Tripledacus " where their ship crashes on the planet. Upon arriving on Gaia the Jointrons briefly fight Bighorn, Diver, Tasmanian Kid, Starscream and BB. After chasing away the Predacons the Tripledacus notice the remaining mechs are Maximals and become friends with them. Later, when Tripledacus confronts Megastorm, Starscream and BB the Maximals arrive to chase the Predacons away from their new ally.

The Jointron Brothers appear in episode #15, "The Festive Jointrons", where they throw a party with the Maximals which is invaded by Dirge and Thrust. They are able to get the Predacons to party, who end up getting drunk. They later fight the Predacons Autoroller and Autostinger, combining into Tripledacus to overpower them. The Jointrons then return to partying.

The Jointrons then appear in episode #16, "A Fearsome Combination Plan?" where they fight Starscream and BB.

The Jointrons appear in episode #17, "Who Is the Leader!?" where they are captured by the Predacons but then rescued by the Maximals.

The Jointron Brothers appear in Beast Wars: Super Lifeform Transformers Special segment "Lio Convoy Crisis". In this episode the Jointron Brothers fight the Seacons.

Tripledacus had a biography printed in the Beast Wars Sourcebook by IDW Publishing. In this book it is established that the Jointrons purposely made his form a mockery of the Predacon Tripredacus.

Motorarm and Gimlet have small cameos in Beast Wars: The Ascending #4 as rioting Cybertonians. They are depicted in Cybertornian robot forms.

Predacons
The legacy of the ancient Decepticon Empire, the Predacons (called Destrons in Japan) seek to reclaim Cybertron and the universe. In order to do it, they need to claim the powerful and mysterious Angolmois Energy on Gaia. They must overcome Lio Convoy and his motley crew of Maximal youths to begin their conquest of the galaxy.

Despite many of the Predacons having a vehicle alternate mode instead of a beast mode, they were still considered Predacons, as the faction name does not imply a beast mode. Though several Predacons (besides Megastorm and BB) have classic Decepticon names, they are not the same characters.

 Galvatron — An evil emperor who plots to rule the universe, Galvatron is ambitious yet shows unexpected affection for his underlings. He is often put to sleep by the Maximals' activities or Megastorm's schemes, but when he wakes, he is the mightiest being of all, due in part to his absorption of Angolmois Energy. Of his three forms (robot, dragon and drill tank), his dragon mode's power far surpasses that of Lio Convoy. He has a habit of talking in his sleep. Galvatron is eventually defeated, and his lifeless body is used to house the essence of Unicron during the events of Beast Wars Neo. Galvatron also appeared in the Official Transformers Collector's Convention story "Wreckers Finale," in which his forces-including Waspinator from the first Beast Wars series-destroy a Quintesson task force that has invaded Cybertron.

 Megastorm — Megastorm transforms into a green tank resembling an M1A1 Abrams, and his attacks have the highest class of destructive force of any in the story. The problem is that he takes too long before he fires. His brother Galvatron is more idealistic and fastidious...while Megastorm has that much more of a realistic atmosphere than his elder sibling about him. Having learned of the Angolmois Energy, the fearsome secret of the planet that is the stage for their battles, his brother has become cautious, which has led Megastorm to be disloyal and mistrustful at times. Upon Magmaboss' debut, Megastorm dived in the Angolmois Energy, and evolved under its influence into Gigastorm. He transforms in three stages, from destroying dinosaur to monolithic base to attack fortress. His audacious offensives, making use of his tremendous power, force the Maximals into tight spots again and again. He is on the verge of no longer considering Galvatron his older brother, and the danger of a split in the camp always seems eminent. The Gigahorn on his head is harder than diamond, and can pierce through all manner of things. Megastorm was a repurposed toy design for the original Megatron from G2, while his Gigastorm form is recolored from G1 Trypticon. He received something of a tribute in Fun Publications' Beast Wars: Shattered Glass storyline, in which a version of G1 Megatron took on his original form and then created and piloted a giant mech in the form of Gigastorm. Gigastorm's drone partner Gigascouter forms Gigastorm's dinosaur chest plate, and is a redeco of G1 Full-Tilt. Gigascouter also transforms into a futuristic car.

 Starscream — Small of body but great of pride, Starscream is the hulking BB's superior officer. He transforms into a black fighter jet. A robot of unparalleled ambition, more even than Galvatron, he dreams of becoming leader himself. His special abilities are the Formation Scream (where his jet form combines with BB's jet form to create a larger jet, with Starscream forming the rear of the combo) and his two Screamwinder missiles. He enjoys Wagner, and has even psyched himself up the composer's pieces when starting an attack. After being blasted into the Angolmois Energy by Gigastorm, Starscream's hatred reacted with the evil Angolmois Energy and changed him into Hellscream, where he had a cyborg sawshark alt mode (which is a heavy retooling of the original Cybershark from Beast Wars I). Even more savage and cruel than before, Hellscream attacks his opponents colorfully with such weapons as his shark-winders and Terror-storm. He is biding his time for a chance to force Gigastorm from power. Hellscream appeared as one of Shokaract's Heralds in Beast Wars: The Ascending.

 BB — Though large of form, BB responds only with the single word "Roger" and carries out his duties faithfully. There may be some fateful trauma between the two. A rarity among the Predacons, he is a reliable soldier who has restrained his eccentric side. He is a triple changer, transforming into a black bomber aircraft that resembles a Northrop Grumman B-2 Spirit equipped with an underslung Gatling missile launcher and a tank. He also forms the bulk of the Formation Scream. He can launch a barrage of Screamwinder missiles in rapid-fire, which he shares with Starscream, from his BB Launcher. When dropped into the Angolmois Energy with Starscream, BB's hatred reacted with the evil Angolmois Energy and turned him into Max B, with the alternate mode of a cybernetic wolf (which is a heavy retooling of the mold used for Wolfang and K-9 from Beast Wars I). His ferocity increased, he has come to enjoy acts of destruction. His multi-purpose Backstop weapon is equipped on his back, and his tail can become a weapon as well. Truly, he could be called a walking machine of destruction. His loyalty to Hellscream, however, has not changed. Max B also appeared as one of the Heralds of Shokaract in Beast Wars: The Ascending.

 Dirge — Dirge is a sonic soldier who glides freely through the skies. He transforms into a blue Dassault Rafale fighter jet. In character, he is very much the sharp "straight man" of a comedy duo, speaking veritable storms of malicious insults. He can store his weapon (Dirge Gun) in his legs, or change it to a long-barreled form and increase its power. Surprisingly, Dirge is a gourmet, the type who fusses over the quality and cooking methods for energy. He later received a transfusion of Angolmois Energy from Gigastorm, recreating him as Dirgegun, who specializes in attacks that drive computers crazy. He possesses a cyborg wasp alternate mode (which is a redeco of Waspinator from Beast Wars I) and wields a Needle Launcher, which injects powerful computer viruses into his enemies. His Needle Shot, with its incredible rate of rapid fire, launches spears that paralyze his enemies. His "Blast Leader" is a sonic attack that yields tremendous results. Dirgegun appeared as one of Shokaract's Heralds in Beast Wars: The Ascending. His toy form was later recolored to create Thrustinator, an alternate version of the Predacon Waspinator with elements of the Vehicon Thrust from Beast Machines. His Dirge form also appears in "Beast Wars: Shattered Glass"

 Thrust — Despite having the personality of a comedy duo's goofy "gag man," Thrust is actually the shrewdest of the Predacons. He transforms into a yellow Lockheed Martin F-22 Raptor fighter jet. He and his buddy Dirge form a well-known combo. Like Dirge, he can store his weapon in his legs or increase its power by converting it to long-barreled form. Thrust hates sea breezes, as they rust him, and thus hates Scuba as well. He later received a transfusion of Angolmois Energy from Gigastorm, recreating him as Thrustor, a cybernetic velociraptor (which is a heavy redeco of the mold used for Dinobot from Beast Wars I) wielding attack weapons special only to him. His Dinomissile is a deadly projectile that clamps onto an enemy and then explodes. His Trash-horn can freeze a dissected enemy's body. His Raptor Shield is a deflective barrier that can rotate at high speed. Thrustor appeared as one of Shokaract's Heralds in Beast Wars: The Ascending.

Autorollers
A group of Predacons loyal to Galvatron. Two of them - Autojetter and Autolauncher - appear in "Beast Wars: Shattered Glass" as Autobots who were reprogrammed into joining Megatron's Predacons. All their toys carry mechanics that transform the vehicle form into the robot when the vehicle is rolled forward. All four Autorollers were sold under the South Korean version of Car Robots/Robots In Disguise as the Autobot "Scoutforce", with members Scoutslasher (Autocrusher), Scoutjet (Autojetter), Scoutlauncher (Autolauncher) and Scoutstinger (Autostinger). All the Autorollers are recolors of the Generation 2 Autoroller molds, however since due to the cancellation of that toyline 2 of them have never been released, Beast Wars II was the first time the jet and armored car have gotten a release.

 Autostinger — Leader of the Autorollers, Autostinger is a warrior who was once known throughout space as an accomplished mercenary. He fought against and was beaten by the Predacons, but was saved by Galvatron before he was to be executed. Since then, he has placed all his loyalty towards serving directly under Galvatron as captain of his bodyguards. The twin homing missiles on his right arm tenaciously chase down his quarry, while the pincers on his left arm can be used as a stun gun. He transforms into a yellow dump truck. He is a redeco of Generation 2 Dirtbag in yellow.

 Autocrusher — A tough sergeant with a body strengthened by bulky armor, he is forever browbeating the younger Predacon members. He is often given the name "Autocrasher". The shovel on his chest is particularly sturdy, able to deflect all manner of attacks. His motto is "A soldier does not have to think about why he fights. He just needs to win." The buzz-saw on his left arm can fell forest after forest of insect nests, while the missiles on his right arm are homing types, like Autostinger's left arm can be used as a stun gun. He is also the oldest member of the Autorollers. He transforms into a green tractor shovel. He is a redeco of Generation 2 Roadblock in grass green color.

 Autojetter — An aerial guard, Autojetter preserves air supremacy at Galvatron's side when the latter flies in dragon mode. His personality is somewhat problematic, as he has a habit of enjoying war for his own pleasure. He has a serious hatred of insects after getting dragonflies sucked into his intakes and crashing. The triple rockets on his arms are outstandingly powerful, and can be used on both land and sea. He is also the youngest member of the Autorollers. He transforms into a blue F/A-18 jet fighter, a mold that was supposed to be released in Generation 2 originally.

 Autolauncher — An expert with a spear-gun. Quite the glory hog for a bodyguard, he will neglect Galvatron's safety to be the first into the enemy camp, which has gotten him chewed out by his captain, Autostinger. The disc launcher in his chest also has a timer function, launching discs deep into enemy bases and then exploding them. He is a rival with his fellow "discmaster" Mantis. He transforms into a red armoured car, a mold that was supposed to be released in Generation 2 originally.

Seacon Space Pirates
The Seacon Space Pirates are a rogue Predacon group who place no actual interest on the battle on Gaia. The five are able to combine into God Neptune when they call out "Five-bot Fusion!" Brandishing his gigantic "Neptune Sword", God Neptune smashes all who defy him. The four members besides Halfshell form the limbs, but it is a lot tougher on those who become the legs, which sometimes leads to arguments, so the combination does not go very well. In combined form, he is a match even for Galvatron and is an especially invincible force in the ocean.

Alternate versions of the Seacons also appeared in the "Beast Wars: Shattered Glass," where they form God Neptune in order to battle the Autobot/Maximal combiner Magnaboss. Apart from Scylla, each of these is actually one of the Decepticon Seacons from the original toyline with two of their number having perished while the remaining four had their appearances changed to reflect the Beast Wars II uses of their toy molds.

 'Halfshell — Leader of the space pirates, Halfshell is very highly calculating, seeing everything in terms of money. He is merciless against foe, and gentle toward friends. He transforms into a mecha sea turtle, and is armed with Shell Cannon in mecha-beast-mode and Dai Sharin Cutter in robot mode. A re-paint of the Seacon Snaptrap.

 Scylla — Scylla is the Seacons' only female fighter. She's fond of display, and is a proud woman. She fell love with Scuba at first sight. She transforms into a mecha squid and is armed with a Skelaser in beast mode. She uses Shi No Nage Kiss in beast mode. She is a re-paint of the Seacon Tentakill.

 Coelagon — 80,000 years old, Coelegon is a knowledgeable coelacanth Transformer. However, his "knowledge" of treasures is frequently false. He knows the existence of Angolmois Energy, and he guides Seacons to Gaia. He transforms into a mecha-coelacanth and is armed with the Coela Fubuki in beast mode. A re-paint of the Seacon Skalor.

 Seaphantom — Seaphantom is a shark Transformer. Like a bullet, he is a very warlike and is a heavy eater. He likes to make a surprise attacks with his simple-teleport ability. Weapons include Phantom Jaws in beast mode and Phantom Fin, also in beast mode. A re-paint of the Seacon Overbite.

 Terrormander — A manta transformer, Terrormandar is the youngest of the Seacons. He is a lazy boy, though once he fights, his destructive power is incredible. He is armed with MandarRock in beast mode and MandarBreak in beast mode. A re-paint of Seacon; Seawing.

The Lobster Seacon Nautilator wasn't used in this series.

Other Characters
 Artemis — A mysterious robotic woman who watches the events of the Maximals and Predacons on Gaia. She aids the Maximals against Galvatron when she needs to, carrying a large mallet to keep her partner, Moon, in line. Despite siding with the Maximals, she is often torn due to being smitten by the Predacon Starscream and the Maximal Scuba. These crushes greatly annoy Moon.

 Moon — Moon is a rabbit Transformer who watches over Gaia with his partner Artemis. He usually acts as the more calm observer to Artemis’ more flighty side. While supposedly neutral, he often sides with the Maximals due to his concerns of the destructive Predacon nature.

 Star Upper — A boxing kangaroo, very proud of his victories (sometimes getting on other Maximal’ nerves with all of his bragging), but fears not being good enough to be a real warrior. Very strong in both modes, he uses more combo-attacks than any other Maximal. Star Upper does not appear in the anime, but does appear in the manga and video game.

 Black Lio Convoy — A sinister clone of Lio Convoy created by mysterious technology found on Gaia, it attempted to join the Predacons before being confronted by the Maximals, whom it created duplicates of to serve as its minions. However, it was eventually defeated when Lio Convoy destroyed the device that created him, causing him and the other duplicates to vanish.

 Majin Zarak — A super-weapon whose origins are unknown, Majin Zarak is the ultimate threat against the Maximals, existing only to destroy. It transforms to base-carrier mode equipped with Zarak-Cannon and missiles. Its demonic robot mode is designed to destroy entire armies with powerful weaponry and super thick armor. It has no true personality, but is effective at what he does. No one knows if this is related to the original Scorponok's head.

Theme songs
Openings
"GET MY FUTURE"
April 1, 1998 -September 30, 1998
Lyricist: Cyber Nation Network / Composer: Cyber Nation Network / Arranger: Cyber Nation Network / Singers: Cyber Nation Network
Episodes: 1-27
"SUPER VOYAGER"
October 7, 1998 - January 27, 1999
Lyricist: Cyber Nation Network / Composer: Cyber Nation Network / Arranger: Cyber Nation Network / Singers: Cyber Nation Network
Episodes: 28-43

Endings

April 1, 1998 - January 27, 1999
Lyricist: Eiko Kiyo / Composer: Hiroto Ishikawa / Arranger: Seiichi Kyoda / Singers: Jun Yoneya
Episodes: 1-43

Insert Songs

Lyricist: Kensaku Saito / Composer: Hideki Fujisawa / Arranger: Hideki Fujisawa / Singers: COA
"MY SHOOTING STAR"
Lyricist: COA / Composer: COA / Arranger: COA / Singers: COA

Episodes

Chapters

Toy line
The series was primarily repaints of non-show Beast Wars figures and repaints of Generation 2 figures, including two unreleased Autoroller figures and the black Dreadwing/Smokecreen repaint, planned for the cancelled 1996 assortment of figures. In both cases the items were recolored and slightly remolded; repainted versions of five of the Seacons also served as new Predacon characters.

The series did feature new molds for Lio Convoy and Galvatron, as well as the Tako Tank. Generation 1 Trypticon, and Beast Wars Dinobot, Cybershark, Wolfang, and Waspinator were remolded as "upgraded" versions of Megastorm, Starscream, BB, Dirge and Thrust.

The remolded Cybershark saw release as Overbite in the U.S. as Universe exclusive.

References

External links

Official Ashi Productions website  
NAS website 
Official Ashi Productions website  

1998 Japanese television series debuts
1998 anime television series debuts
1998 manga
1999 Japanese television series endings
1999 comics endings
Children's manga
Japanese children's animated action television series
Japanese children's animated science fantasy television series
Japanese children's animated space adventure television series
Japanese children's animated superhero television series
Japanese television series based on American television series
Manga series
Post-apocalyptic anime and manga
Superheroes in anime and manga
TV Tokyo original programming
Television shows set in the United States
Transformers (franchise) animated television series
War in anime and manga